Arthur William Gebaur Jr. (February 22, 1919–Missing in Action and presumed dead in Korean War on August 29, 1952) was awarded the Distinguished Service Cross for action in the war.  The Air Force named Grandview Air Force Base Richards-Gebaur Air Force Base in his honor.

Gebaur was born in Kansas City, Missouri. He graduated from Northeast High School in 1936. He was an active member of the ROTC reaching the rank of Cadet 2nd Lieutenant. He was called Arthur by his teachers, but Jr. by his friends.

External links
Korean War profile

1919 births
1952 deaths
People from Kansas City, Missouri
Recipients of the Distinguished Service Cross (United States)
Military personnel missing in action
American military personnel killed in the Korean War
United States Air Force personnel of the Korean War
United States Air Force officers